D33 connects Šibenik to Drniš and Knin. Furthermore, the road has junctions to major state roads, namely D8 in Šibenik, connecting to Biograd na Moru and Trogir, and D1 in Knin, which in turn connects to Sinj to the south and to Gračac to the north. The southern terminus of the road is found in Vidici interchange near Šibenik. The road is also connected to A1 motorway in Šibenik interchange. The northern terminus of the road is at Strmica border crossing to Bosnia and Herzegovina, where the road proceeds to Drvar.

The road, as well as all other state roads in Croatia, is managed and maintained by Hrvatske ceste, a state-owned company.

Traffic volume 

Traffic is regularly counted and reported by Hrvatske ceste, operator of the road. Substantial variations between annual (AADT) and summer (ASDT) traffic volumes are attributed to the fact that the road serves as a connection to A1 motorway and it carries substantial tourist traffic.

Road junctions and populated areas

See also
 Highways in Croatia
 Hrvatske autoceste

Maps

Sources

D033
D033